Chaucer's Retraction is the final section of The Canterbury Tales. It is written as an apology, where Geoffrey Chaucer asks for forgiveness for the vulgar and unworthy parts of this and other past works, and seeks absolution for his sins.

It is not clear whether these are sincere declarations of remorse on Chaucer's part, a continuation of the theme of penitence from the Parson's Tale or simply a way to advertise the rest of his works.  It is not even certain if the retraction was an integral part of the Canterbury Tales or if it was the equivalent of a death bed confession which became attached to this his most popular work.

External links

Modern Translation of Chaucer's Retraction and Other Resources at eChaucer

Retraction